Marc Rosset was the defending champion at the Milan Indoor tennis tournament but lost in the second round to Greg Rusedski.

Roger Federer won in the final 6–4, 6–7(7–9), 6–4 against Julien Boutter. It was Federer's first title of the year and the first of his career.

Seeds
A champion seed is indicated in bold text while text in italics indicates the round in which that seed was eliminated.

  Marat Safin (quarterfinals)
  Yevgeny Kafelnikov (semifinals)
  Dominik Hrbatý (first round)
  Nicolas Kiefer (first round)
  Andrei Pavel (first round)
  Sjeng Schalken (first round)
  Roger Federer (champion)
  Marc Rosset (second round)

Draw

References

External links
 2001 Main draw

Milan Indoor
2001 ATP Tour
Milan